Lineopalpa is a genus of moths of the family Noctuidae.

Species
Lineopalpa birena Holloway, 1976
Lineopalpa horsfieldi Guenee, 1852
Lineopalpa inexpectata (Gaede, 1940)
Lineopalpa orsara Swinhoe, 1903
Lineopalpa rufa (Bethune-Baker, 1906)

References
Natural History Museum Lepidoptera genus database

Calpinae
Moth genera